Curry Township is one of nine townships in Sullivan County, Indiana, United States. As of the 2010 census, its population was 3,559 and it contained 1,643 housing units.

The township is named after William Curry, who was the area's first settler when he arrived there in 1817 from Kentucky.

Geography

Cities, towns, villages
 Farmersburg
 Shelburn

Unincorporated towns
 Baldridge at 
 Curryville at 
 East Shelburn at 
 Standard at 
 Wilfred at 
(This list is based on USGS data and may include former settlements.)

Adjacent townships
 Linton Township, Vigo County (north)
 Pierson Township, Vigo County (northeast)
 Jackson Township (east)
 Hamilton Township (south)
 Turman Township (southwest)
 Fairbanks Township (west)
 Prairie Creek Township, Vigo County (northwest)

Cemeteries
The township contains these four cemeteries: Douglas Chapel, Ebenezer, McKinney and West Lawn.

Major highways
  U.S. Route 41

Airports and landing strips
 Austin Air Ads Airport

School districts
 Northeast School Corporation

Political districts
 Indiana's 8th congressional district
 State House District 45
 State Senate District 39

References
 United States Census Bureau 2008 TIGER/Line Shapefiles
 United States Board on Geographic Names (GNIS)
 IndianaMap

External links
 Indiana Township Association
 United Township Association of Indiana

Townships in Sullivan County, Indiana
Terre Haute metropolitan area
Townships in Indiana